Roarin' Town is the eleventh studio album by Australian rock band The Black Sorrows. The album was released in October 2006. It was the first studio album from The Black Sorrows since Beat Club in 1998.
Camilleri said he wrote the tracks throughout 2005 and called the song "What Levi Wants", the son of "Harley + Rose", "not because they sound like each other, it just started to speak in the same way."

The album was re-released in May 2007, with a 7-track live CD.

Reception
Bruce Elder from Sydney Morning Herald said; "This is the first new Black Sorrows album in nearly a decade and it doesn't do the brand name any favours." adding "There are moments when the old magic re-emerges... But the rest of the material fails to excite"

Track listing 
(all tracks written by Joe Camelleri and Nick Smith)
 "Lonesome Road" - 5:04
 "What Levi Wants" - 4:26
 "It Ain't True" - 3:51
 "Where's It All Gonna End" - 3:00
 "Headful of Stars" - 4:14
 "In Your Lover's Arms Tonight" - 4:43
 "Restless Heart"	- 5:10
 "Word to the Wise" - 3:40
 "Comfort Me" - 4:07
 "Lay By My Side" - 4:09
 "The Richest Man  in the World" - 4:24
 "Best Thing" - 2:52
 "That Tune on the Jukebox" - 3:55

2007 Bonus disc
 "Harley + Rose" (Live)	
 "Daughters Of Glory" (Live)	
 "Chained to the Wheel" (Live)	
 "Snake Skin Shoes" (Live)	
 "Mystified" (Live)	
 "Last One Standing For You" (Live)	
 "Hold On to Me" (Live)

Release History

References

External links
 "One Mo' Time" at discogs.com

2006 albums
The Black Sorrows albums
Albums produced by Joe Camilleri